Uhuru Stadium (formerly known as the Tanzania National Stadium) is adjacent to the National Stadium in Miburani ward of Temeke District in Dar es Salaam, Tanzania.

History
Tanganyika's independence ceremony was celebrated at this stadium on 9 December 1961. The independence anniversary has been celebrated at the stadium each year since then. It also has been the venue for the inaugural address of all past presidents.

The funeral service of Julius Nyerere, Tanzania's first president, was held at the stadium on 21 October 1999. Shortly after his death in office, president John Magufuli was laid-in-state at the stadium on 20 March 2021. Forty-five people were killed in a stampede at the stadium on March 21, 2021.

References

External links
 Tanzania's New National Stadium and the Rhetoric of Development by Steve Sortijas

Football venues in Tanzania
Sport in Dar es Salaam
Sports venues completed in 2009
2009 establishments in Tanzania
Buildings and structures in Dar es Salaam